The Hunter is a 1980 American biographical action thriller film directed by Buzz Kulik and starring Steve McQueen. The film was McQueen's final role before his death in November of that year at age 50.

The cast also features Eli Wallach, Kathryn Harrold, LeVar Burton, Ben Johnson, and Richard Venture. This was the last theatrical film made by director Buzz Kulik.

Plot
Ralph "Papa" Thorson (Steve McQueen) arrives in a small town in Illinois where, despite being a terrible driver (a running joke used throughout the film), he captures fugitive Tommy Price (LeVar Burton) for fleeing on his bail. Thorson next drives to Houston to bring in a dangerous punk named Billie Joe, whose kinfolk include Sheriff Strong (Ben Johnson), a corrupt redneck lawman who warns Thorson not to get involved. Papa ignores him and ends up in a destructive fight with the enormous fugitive but succeeds in apprehending him.

Thorson drives both Tommy Price and Billie Joe back to Los Angeles, where he collects his reward for bringing them back. However, Thorson vouches for Price, who soon begins fixing things at Thorson's house and becomes one of Thorson's many acquaintances who hang out there.

At home, Thorson is an old-fashioned guy who has a love of antique toys and classical music. His schoolteacher girlfriend Dotty (Kathryn Harrold) is pregnant and would like "Papa" to be there for her when the baby is born, but his job continually keeps him on the road.

Thorson works for elderly bail bondsman Ritchie Blumenthal (Eli Wallach) who sends him out on dangerous assignments to chase down fugitives in all parts of the US. However, Thorson himself is stalked by psychotic killer Rocco Mason (Tracey Walter), who was one of Thorson's former convicts.

Thorson is sent to rural Nebraska to bring back two fugitives, the Branch Brothers. He flies out to Nebraska and heads to the Branch farmhouse, where the two psycho brothers steal his rental car and try to kill him with dynamite. Thorson commandeers a combine harvester and chases after the two Branch Brothers through a cornfield. A stick of dynamite they drop blows up the car, but they both survive. Thorson arrives back at the local airport with the destroyed car on a trailer and brings the Branch Brothers on a plane back to Los Angeles.

Meanwhile, Rocco Mason terrorizes Dotty at her workplace, which leads Thorson to try to protect her, but she instead tries to make him give up his bounty hunter way of life and to take her to a Lamaze class. When Thorson grows tired of it and tells Dotty he wishes she would've had an abortion, she threatens to leave him.

Thorson's police friend Captain Spota (Richard Venture) commits suicide after he is investigated for dealing illegal drugs from the department's evidence rooms, whereupon Thorson starts drinking more heavily.

Blumenthal sends Thorson to a Chicago slum to pick up fugitive Anthony Bernardo (Thomas Rosales Jr.), a dangerous ex-con. Thorson and Bernardo exchange gunfire with each other at an apartment building. Thorson then chases Bernardo on foot through the streets to an elevated train where Thorson is forced to climb on the roof of the train to avoid being shot. The long chase leads to the Marina City complex, where they both steal vehicles and drive to an upper level of the parking garage. There the psychotic fugitive accidentally drives off the edge and plunges to his death in the Chicago River.

Returning to Los Angeles, Thorson learns from a badly beaten Price that Dotty has been kidnapped by Rocco Mason, who is holding her at the high school where she teaches. There Mason disarms Thorson, kills a security guard with an assault rifle, and attempts to kill Thorson. Thorson lures Mason into a chemistry classroom that he has flooded with flammable gas. Mason opens fire, igniting the gas and blowing up the room and himself.

Dottie goes into labor, and Thorson rushes her to the hospital, where he collapses in the lobby. When he comes to and walks back outside, Dotty has already given birth and he holds their new baby, who looks eerily like McQueen himself.

Cast

 Steve McQueen as Ralph 'Papa' Thorson
 Eli Wallach as Ritchie Blumenthal
 Kathryn Harrold as Dotty Thorson
 LeVar Burton as Tommy Price
 Ben Johnson as Sheriff Strong
 Richard Venture as Police Captain Spota
 Tracey Walter as Rocco Mason
 Thomas Rosales Jr. as Anthony Bernardo
 Theodore Wilson as Winston Blue
 Ray Bickel as Luke Branch
 Bobby Bass as Matthew Branch
 Karl Schueneman as Billie Joe
 Christopher Keane as Mike
 Nathaniel Taylor as Trotter
 Alex Ross as Chief McCurdy
 F. William Parker as Watch Commander
 Jodi Moon as Billie Joe's Girlfriend
 Zora Margolis as La Maze Leader
 Frederick Sistaine as Pimp
 Taurean Blacque as Hustler
 Patti Clifton as Sexy Woman
 Tony Burton as Garbageman #1
 Morgan Roberts as Garbageman #2
 Michael D. Roberts as Poker Player
 Ralph "Papa" Thorson as The Bartender
 Poppy Lagos as Mrs. Bernardo
 Al Ruscio as Mr. Bernardo (uncredited)
 David Spielberg as Sergeant Werblo (uncredited)
 Jophery Brown as Train Passenger (uncredited)

Production

Development
The film was developed by Rastar and set up at Paramount. Richard Levinson and William Link wrote the initial script based on Christopher Keane's biography of the real Ralph "Papa" Thorson. Steve McQueen became attached to star, and Mort Engelberg was to produce.

Peter Hyams was hired to write and direct, but was fired after doing a draft. McQueen wanted to replace him as director, but the DGA would not allow it because McQueen had been on the project before Hyams. McQueen made the film following Tom Horn. Around this time he was also signed for Tai Pan at the highest fee any actor had received.

Shooting
Filming began in September 1979. McQueen reportedly did a lot of directing on set.

The opening street scene was shot in Joliet, Illinois. The capture of Tommy Price (LeVar Burton) in Herscher and payphone scenes with Papa Thorson (Steve McQueen) talking to Sheriff Strong (Ben Johnson) were filmed in Bonfield. The classic riverhouse explosion early in the picture was filmed on the Kankakee River near Aroma Park. The structure was built for the film and then destroyed. The cabin was taken apart (not destroyed) and reassembled and sold for a hunting retreat on an island in the Kankakee river basin.

The airport scene where Papa picks up the Trans Am was filmed at the Greater Kankakee Airport. Historic downtown Lemont was used for the scene where Steve McQueen performs a burnout in front of the police officer. Also, the current public works building across from the post office was used as the police station and jail. The cornfield chase scenes between the Firebird and combine were filmed in Manteno on a farm that shared property with the Lithuanian World Center and is now the site of a current residential development.

A portion of the film was shot in Old Town, Chicago, on the El. Scenes involving Papa chasing his quarry "Bernardo" in a parking garage were shot at Marina City. The stunt with the fleeing suspect driving off the Marina City garage and plunging into the Chicago River was recreated in 2006 for a commercial for Allstate Insurance.

Release
The film opened on August 1, 1980 in 425 theaters in the United States and Canada.

Reception

Critical reception
The Hunter holds a 46% approval rating based on 13 reviews, with an average rating of 5.2/10 at Rotten Tomatoes. In Leonard Maltin's publication TV Movies, the film is given a BOMB rating and the entry states: "McQueen's last picture and probably his worst."

Box office
The film grossed $7.2 million in its first 12 days of release in the United States and Canada. It went on to gross $16.3 million there.

References

External links
 
 
 
 

1980 films
1980 action films
1980s biographical films
American action thriller films
American biographical films
Films scored by Michel Legrand
Action films based on actual events
Films directed by Buzz Kulik
Paramount Pictures films
Films set in Chicago
Films shot in Chicago
Films set in Los Angeles
Films shot in Los Angeles
1980s English-language films
1980s American films